United Nations Security Council resolution 650, adopted unanimously on 27 March 1990, after recalling resolutions 637 (1989) and 644 (1989), the Council endorsed the report by the Secretary-General and decided to authorise an enlargement of the United Nations Observer Group in Central America (ONUCA) in order to demobilise the Contras in Nicaragua.

The size of ONUCA was increased by an additional 800 personnel, including the addition of a Venezuelan combat battalion and security to oversee weapons disposal in Honduras. It also authorized the addition of armed personnel to its ranks and requested that the Secretary-General keep the Council updated on the resolution's implementation.

See also
 History of Central America
 List of United Nations Security Council Resolutions 601 to 700 (1987–1991)

References

External links
 
Text of the Resolution at undocs.org

 0650
History of Central America
Politics of Central America
 0650
 0650
March 1990 events